Brian Bolinger is an American football official in the National Football League (NFL) who serves as a line judge and down judge. He has been with the NFL since 2017, and previously was a high school and college official.

Bolinger started as a high school official in the 1990s. He was an NCAA Division III official from 2001 to 2004, an NCAA Division II official in 2005, a Mid-American Conference official from 2006 to 2012, and a Big Ten Conference official from 2013 until being hired by the NFL in 2017. In 2020, he officiated his first playoff game, between the Baltimore Ravens and Tennessee Titans.

References

See also
 List of National Football League officials

Year of birth missing (living people)
Living people
College football officials
National Football League officials
Indiana State University alumni